This is a list of federal universities in Brazil.

 Universidade da Integração Internacional da Lusofonia Afro-Brasileira (UNILAB)
 Universidade de Brasília (UnB)
 Universidade do Rio de Janeiro (UNIRIO)
 Universidade Federal do ABC (UFABC)
 Universidade Federal do Acre (UFAC)
 Universidade Federal de Alagoas (UFAL)
 Universidade Federal de Alfenas (Unifal-MG)
 Universidade Federal do Amapá (UNIFAP)
 Universidade Federal do Amazonas (UFAM)
 Universidade Federal da Bahia (UFBA)
 Universidade Federal de Campina Grande (UFCG)
 Universidade Federal do Ceará (UFC)
 Universidade Federal do Cariri (UFCA)
 Universidade Federal do Espirito Santo (UFES)
 Universidade Federal Fluminense (UFF)
 Universidade Federal de Goiás (UFG)
 Universidade Federal da Grande Dourados (UFGD)
 Universidade Federal de Itajubá (UNIFEI)
 Universidade Federal de Juiz de Fora (UFJF)
 Universidade Federal de Lavras (UFLA)
 Universidade Federal do Maranhão (UFMA)
 Universidade Federal de Mato Grosso (UFMT)
 Universidade Federal de Mato Grosso do Sul (UFMS)
 Universidade Federal de Minas Gerais (UFMG)
 Universidade Federal do Oeste do Pará (UFOPA)
 Universidade Federal de Ouro Preto (UFOP)
 Universidade Federal do Pampa (UNIPAMPA)
 Universidade Federal do Pará (UFPA)
 Universidade Federal do Paraná (UFPR)
 Universidade Federal da Paraíba (UFPB)
 Universidade Federal de Pelotas (UFPEL)
 Universidade Federal de Pernambuco (UFPE)
 Universidade Federal do Piauí (UFPI)
 Universidade Federal do Rio de Janeiro (UFRJ)
 Universidade Federal do Rio Grande (FURG)
 Universidade Federal do Rio Grande do Norte (UFRN)
 Universidade Federal do Rio Grande do Sul (UFRGS)
 Universidade Federal de Rondônia (UNIR)
 Universidade Federal de Roraima (UFRR)
 Universidade Federal de Santa Maria (UFSM)
 Universidade Federal de Santa Catarina (UFSC)
 Universidade Federal de Sergipe (UFS)
 Universidade Federal de São Carlos (UFSCar)
 Universidade Federal de São Paulo (UNIFESP)
 Universidade Federal do Sul da Bahia (UFSB)
 Universidade Federal do Sul e Sudeste do Pará (UNIFESSPA)
 Universidade Federal do Triângulo Mineiro (UFTM)
 Universidade Federal do Tocantins (UFT)
 Universidade Federal de Uberlândia (UFU)
 Universidade Federal dos Vales do Jequitinhonha e Mucuri (UFVJM)
 Universidade Federal do Vale do São Francisco (UNIVASF)
 Universidade Federal de Viçosa (UFV)
 Universidade Federal Rural da Amazônia (UFRA)
 Universidade Federal Rural de Pernambuco (UFRPE)
 Universidade Federal Rural do Rio de Janeiro (UFRRJ)
 Universidade Federal Rural do Semi-Árido (UFERSA)
 Universidade Tecnológica Federal do Paraná (UTFPR)

See also 

Federal institutions of Brazil
Universities and Higher Education in Brazil

 
Federal Universities
Brazil
University